Poochi Srinivasa Iyengar (1860 - 1919), whose real name was Ramanathapuram Srinivasa Iyengar, was a singer and composer of Carnatic music. He was born in Ramanathapuram in Tamil Nadu on August 16, 1860. He studied music under Patnam Subramania Iyer  (1845 - 1902), a singer of Carnatic music and came in the sishya parampara of Saint Thyagaraja. He had a large number of disciples, of whom the most popular was Ariyakudi Ramanuja Iyengar. He composed over 100 songs and used the mudra Srinivasa in his compositions. He died on July 20, 1919.

"The appellation 'Poochi' (पूच्चि/பூச்சி) meaning 'insect' is rather strange.  There are surmises that his raga elaboration resembled the humming of a beetle, or that he used to apply sandal paste on his body and the Tamil word 'Poochu' had become 'Poochi', or that he was known for his tireless activity like the bee; but the real reason is not known.

Compositions

References and audio links

See also

 List of Carnatic composers

External links
 Karnatik.com biography
 

Carnatic composers
Male Carnatic singers
Carnatic singers
1860 births
1919 deaths
20th-century Indian male singers
20th-century Indian singers
19th-century Indian male singers
Singers from Tamil Nadu